The White Squaw is a 1956 American Western film directed by Ray Nazarro and starring David Brian, May Wynn and William Bishop.

Plot
A Swedish settler (David Brian) starts a war when he tries to drive Dakotas off their Wyoming reservation.

Cast
 David Brian as Sigrod Swanson
 May Wynn as Eetay-O-Wahnee
 William Bishop as Bob Garth
 Nancy Hale as Kerry Arnold
 William Leslie as Thor Swanson
 Myron Healey as Eric Swanson
 Robert C. Ross as Knute Swanson
 Frank DeKova as Yellow Elk
 George Keymas as Yotah
 Roy Roberts as Edward Purvis
 Grant Withers as Sheriff
 Wally Vernon as Faro Bill

References

External links

1956 Western (genre) films
1956 films
American Western (genre) films
Columbia Pictures films
1950s English-language films
Films directed by Ray Nazarro
1950s American films
American black-and-white films